Blackie & Son was a publishing house in Glasgow, Scotland, and London, England, from 1809 to 1991.

History
The firm was founded as a bookseller in 1809 by John Blackie (1782–1874) as a partnership with two others and was known as 'Blackie, Fullarton and Company'. It began printing in 1819, using the skill and equipment of Edward Khull. It moved to Glasgow around 1830 and had premises at 8 Clyde Street facing the River Clyde. Following the retirement of Fullarton the company was renamed 'Blackie and Son' in 1831, remaining in the Clyde Street property, and becoming a public limited company in 1890.  Later on, the business moved its Glasgow office to 17 Stanhope Street, and also opened offices at 5 South College Street in Edinburgh and 16/18 William IV Street, Charing Cross, London. The company also opened offices in Canada and India. It ceased publishing in 1991.

Blackie and Son initially published books sold by subscription, including religious texts and reference books.  Later the firm published single volumes, particularly educational texts and children's books, taking advantage of compulsory education from 1870.

Blackie published G. A. Hentys historical adventure books for boys (e.g. With Kitchener in the Soudan and With Lee in Virginia) which were very popular in the British Empire in the later 19th century; Henty wrote 122 books including adult novels. 

Blackie published the many Flower Fairy books of Cicely Mary Barker beginning in 1923. From the 1950s onwards it published The Kennett Library, a graded series of classics retold for schools including:  Kidnapped, Little Women, Westward Ho!, The Black Arrow, Wuthering Heights and Ben-Hur. 

In 1902, Walter Blackie commissioned Hill House on a plot in Helensburgh to the West of Glasgow. At the invitation of their Art Director Talwin Morris, the architect was his friend Charles Rennie Mackintosh. The house is regarded as one of Mackintosh's finest works.

Book series
 Beautiful England
 Beautiful Ireland
 Beautiful Scotland
 Beautiful Switzerland
 Blackie's Boys' Annual
 Blackie's Famous Books
 Blackie's Girls' Annual
 Blackie's Library of Famous Books
 The Casket Library
 The Imperial Library 
 The Kennett Library
 The Red Letter Library
 The Red Letter Poets
 Reward Books
 Student Drama Series
 The Victorian Era Series
 The Wallet Library

Further reading
 Agnes A. C. Blackie, Blackie & Son, 1809-1959: A Short History of the Firm, London : Blackie & Son, 1959.

See also 
 John Dougall (mathematician)
 Walter Jerrold
 UK children's book publishers

References

External links

 
 Records of Blackie & Son Ltd, publishers, Bishopbriggs,	Glasgow, Scotland - archive held by University of Glasgow.
 Free download of Blackie & Son 1886 map of Burmah, Siam and Anam

Book publishing companies of Scotland
Defunct companies of Scotland
Publishing companies disestablished in 1991
Publishing companies established in 1809
Companies based in Glasgow
History of Glasgow
1991 disestablishments in Scotland
1809 establishments in Scotland
British companies established in 1809